The 2016 Telus Cup was Canada's 38th annual national midget 'AAA' hockey championship, played April 18 – 24, 2016 at Quispamsis, New Brunswick.  The North York Rangers defeated the host Saint John Vitos in the gold medal game, while the Lions du Lac du St-Louis won the bronze.

Teams

Round robin

Tiebreaker: Head-to-head record, most wins, highest goal differential.

Playoffs

Individual awards
Most Valuable Player: Matthias Laferrière (Lac St-Louis)
Top Scorer: Matthias Laferrière (Lac St-Louis)
Top Forward: Adam Capannelli (Lac St-Louis)
Top Defensive Player: Ty Smith (Lloydminster)
Top Goaltender: Sandro Silvestre (Lac St-Louis)
Most Sportsmanlike Player: Ty Gitzel (Saskatoon)
Esso Scholarship: Ryan Porter (Dartmouth)

Road to the Telus Cup

Atlantic Region
Saint John Vitos won regional tournament held March 27 to April 3, 2016 at Conception Bay South, Newfoundland and Labrador.  As Saint John already qualified as the host team, the runner-up Dartmouth Major Midgets also advanced to the Telus Cup.

Québec
The Lions du Lac St-Louis advanced to the Telus Cup by winning the Quebec Midget AAA Hockey League championship series.

Central Region
The North York Rangers advanced to the Telus Cup by winning regional tournament held March 27 to April 3, 2016 at Waterloo, Ontario.

West Region
The Saskatoon Contacts advanced to the Telus Cup by winning regional tournament held March 31 to April 2, 2016 at the Rod Hamm Memorial Arena in Saskatoon, Saskatchewan.

Pacific Region
The Lloydminster Bobcats advanced to the Telus Cup by winning regional best-of-three series held April 1 to 3, 2016 at Lloydminster, Saskatchewan.

See also
Telus Cup

References

External links
2016 Telus Cup Home Page
Midget AAA Canada Website
Midget AAA Telus Cup Regional Championship Website

Telus Cup
Telus Cup 2016
Telus Cup
Telus Cup
April 2016 sports events in Canada